Friday the 13th is an unlucky day in western superstition.

Friday the 13th may also refer to:

Friday the 13th horror franchise
Friday the 13th (franchise), a slasher film series
Friday the 13th (1980 film) the first film in the series
Friday the 13th (2009 film), a remake of the series
Friday the 13th: The Series, a television series
Friday the 13th: The Computer Game
Friday the 13th (1989 video game)
Friday the 13th: The Game

Film and television
Friday the 13th (1916 film), an American silent film
Friday the Thirteenth (1933 film), a British comedy-drama
Friday the Thirteenth (1949 film), a German comedy crime film
"Friday the 13th", an episode of Code Lyoko: Evolution
"Friday the 13th", an episode of Beast King GoLion

Music

Albums
Friday the Thirteenth (album), an album by the Stranglers
Friday 13th (EP), an EP by the Damned
Live Ritual – Friday the 13th, a 2002 album by Blasphemy
Live – Friday the 13th, a 2005 DVD and CD by Maroon 5
Friday 13th, a 1984 album by Man
Friday the 13th, a 2016 EP by Misfits

Songs
"Friday the 13th", a composition by Thelonious Monk included on the 1954 album Thelonious Monk and Sonny Rollins
"Friday the 13th", a song by Jolin Tsai from Muse
"Friday the 13th", a song by Nana Kitade from I Scream
"Paraskavedekatriaphobia (Friday the 13)", a song by Fozzy from Chasing the Grail
"Friday 13th" (song), a song by Gorillaz

Other uses
Friday the Thirteenth, a 1907 novel by Thomas W. Lawson

See also
Black Friday (disambiguation)
Friday the 13th mini-crash (13 October 1989), a stock market crash
November 2015 Paris attacks (13 November 2015), sometimes called the Friday the 13th attacks
Triskaidekaphobia, fear of the number 13, and the more specific fear of Friday the 13th known as paraskevidekatriaphobia or friggatriskaidekaphobia

Friday the 13th